Martin Connell may refer to:

 Martin Connell (businessman), Canadian businessman
 Martin Connell (Royal Navy officer) (born 1968), Royal Navy officer